China competed in the 2001 East Asian Games which were held in Osaka, Japan from May 19, 2001 to May 27, 2001.

See also
 China at the Asian Games
 China at the Olympics
 Sports in China

2001 East Asian Games
2001
2001 in Chinese sport